The adoption of plug-in electric vehicles in Iceland is the second highest in the world after Norway, and fully supported by the government. As of 2022, the market share of electric vehicles in Iceland is around 60%, the second-highest in the world behind Norway. Around 12% of the country's car fleet is electrified as of 2022.

Iceland is well suited to the adoption of EVs as driving distances are relatively short, the country has cheap, surplus renewable energy (99.98% renewable electricity in 2022) and has to import all of its fossil fuels. Electric vehicles (EVs) are a key component of the country's environmental policy and compliance with the Paris Agreement, with road transport contributing 20% of Iceland's total greenhouse gas emssions. The Icelandic government plans to ban the import of petrol and diesel cars after 2030.

History 
In 1979, a university engineering professor from the University of Iceland, Gísli Jónsson obtained funding from the university to purchase a Jet Industries Electra Van 500 from the United States. The 4 passenger van had a 50–80 km range and used 16 6-volt batteries. He was an advocate for electric vehicle adoption and the purpose of the van was to test the vehicle in Icelandic conditions and demonstrate the use of electric vehicles in Iceland. It was eventually sold in 1983 and used as a service vehicle for an aluminium smelter and later on a farm in Mývatnssveit.

In 1992, a short lived committee was formed by the Minister for Industry to investigate the viability of electric vehicles in Iceland, it did not achieve its goals and was shut down in 1994. A Peugot 106 electric vehicle was imported in March 1998 by the Reykjavík Electric Utility (now Orkuveita Reykjavíkur) as a demonstration vehicle.

There were a handful of other demonstration and experimental EVs imported in the 1990s, including 2 in Akureyri by the postal service and local utility as well as one by Landsvirkjun. There were only around 10 registered EVs throughout the 1990s until 2010.

Tax incentives were introduced in 2012, and with the introduction of more mass market vehicles such as the Nissan Leaf and the BMW i3, EV sales saw exponential growth. 2013 was the first year EV market share surpassed 1%, increasing to around 11% by 2017 

EV market share grew from 5.7% in 2016 to 59.5% in 2021 with the introduction of many EV models by major manufacturers in the late 2010s. Tesla Motors opened a service and sales center in Iceland in September 2019 which accelerated BEV registrations in Iceland; the Tesla Model 3 became the best selling vehicle in Iceland for 2020, with 858 sold. The Nissan Leaf is the most sold fully electric vehicle in Iceland, with over 3,000 vehicles registered since 2010.

Statistics 
In 2021, the market share of battery electric vehicles (BEV) was 28% and plug-in hybrid electric vehicles (PHEV) was 31%. This brings Iceland's plug-in market share to just under 60%, the second highest market share in the world.

As of September 2022 there were 14,308 BEVs and 19,300 PHEVs in registed use in Iceland. BEVs are just over 5% of the country's car fleet and PHEVs around 7%. This brings EVs to ~12% of the total passenger car fleet in Iceland. New registrations of electric and hybrid vehicles grew by 150% between 2016 and 2017.

Government policy 
Since 2012, there has been no value-added tax on electric vehicles up to a maximum value of 6.5 million ISK. The exemption has a current quota of 15,000 vehicles, which has been extended several times since it entered into force, and is expected to be extended to 20,000 in 2022. Tax incentives for plug-in hybrid vehicles was cut in half in 2021 and are due to be phased out in 2022, to encourage sales of fully electric vehicles. Import duty is also waived. Road tax is also in the lowest bracket, as it is based on the CO2 consumption of the vehicle.

The Icelandic government has also funded the development of fast charging stations around the country, to enable travel further around the island. The government spent around 400 million ISK in the years 2016-2020 in grants to companies such as Orka Nátturunnar (part of Orkuveita Reykjavíkur), Olís, Ísorka and N1 to set up 50-150 kW fast charging stations.

In 2020, laws were changed giving apartment owners the right to install an EV charging stations in their complex, as well as new building codes including the requirement for new electric installations to designed in mind for electric vehicles 

From 2012 to 2022, the Icelandic government spent around 28 billion ISK in tax incentives for EVs.

City of Reykjavík 
The City of Reykjavík allows electric vehicless (without studded tyres) to park for free for 2 hours; this was restricted to fully electric vehicles only in 2019. The City of Reykjavík also began installing charging stations for street parking in 2019, and also began offering grants for apartment buildings to install communal charging infrastucture.

Infrastructure 
Iceland's grid is 100% powered from renewable energy, from a mix of mostly hydroelectric power and geothermal power. There is ample and cheap supply of energy for use by electric vehicles. Electricity supplies to individual homes and businesses is mostly three-phase.

EVs in Iceland generally use the European standard Type 2 (Mennekes) connector and CCS Combo Type 2. Some older vehicles use Type 1 (J1772) and CHAdeMO. As of 2022, there are over 410 charging stations in Iceland, both AC and high power DC.

Public EV charging infrastructure in Iceland began in the mid 2000s when Orkuveita Reykjavíkur began installing EV charing stations at the town hall and in a few locations in Reykjavík, as a demonstration of electric vehicle infrastructure. In 2014, Orka Nátturunnar (a subsidiary of Orkuveita Reykjavíkur) set up Iceland's first 10 CHAdeMO DC fast charging stations, around Reykjavík and in the towns of Selfoss, Borganes and Akranes. Until 2018, they were free of charge. Between 2016 and 2017, Orkusalan (a local power company), gifted Level 2 charging stations to 80 local municipalities, kickstarting a low power charging nework in Iceland.

In 2018, a major milestone was reached in Iceland's EV charging infrastructure, when the ring road (Route 1) was covered by DC fast charging stations with a distance of within 100 km between each station.

Orka Náturunnar's network has subsequently been expanded and upgraded to CCS technology and as of 2022 they have around 50 DC fast chargers with power levels from 50 kW to 225 kW.

In the late 2010s, various other companies began opening their own charging networks such as Ísorka and Tesla. The City of Reykjavík and other municipalities have installed charging stations on street parking spots. Companies Olís and N1 also began installing fast chargers at their service stations around the same time. Tesla opened its first Supercharger station in December 2019 and has 7 Supercharger locations as of 2022.

Public transportation 
In 2018, Strætó bs purchased of four electric buses from Chinese manufacturer Yutong.

See also 

 Electricity sector in Iceland
 Energy in Iceland

References 

Iceland
Road transport in Iceland